Pedro Nolasco Cruz Vergara (April 18, 1857 – November 11, 1939) was a Chilean literary critic, novelist, writer, and politician.

Early life 
Pedro Nolasco Cruz Vergara was born in Molina, Maule Region in central Chile. He was the son of Nicolás de la Cruz Donoso (1827–1860) and Elisa Martinez de Vergara y Loys. His mother was the eldest daughter of Chilean legislator Pedro Nolasco Vergara Albano and Mercedes Vergara-Loys. He was the grandson of Vicente de La Cruz y Bahamonde the nephew and grandson of Nicolas de La Cruz y Bahamonde and Anselmo de La Cruz y Bahamonde. He had one sister, Elisa Cruz Vergara, who married Francisco Javier Sanchez Fresno in 1885.

His paternal great-grandfather, Vicente de la Cruz y Bahamonde, was the brother of Nicolas de la Cruz y Bahamonde, the first Conde de Maule, and the Chilean Minister of Finance Anselmo de La Cruz y Bahamonde.

Career 

He married Susana Correa Vergara (January 10, 1862 – January 31, 1953), his first cousin. The couple had 9 children: Fabio, Nicolás, Pedro Nolasco, Susana, Elisa, Mercedes, Julia, Eduardo and Manuel. Painter and poet Eugenio Cruz Vargas (1923–2014) was one of his grandchildren.

Education 
He attended the College of Parent Escolapios Santiago de Chile. His secondary education came at the College of the Sacred Hearts of Santiago and College of the French Parents. He graduated as a lawyer from the Universidad de Chile on October 27, 1877.

Career

Literary critic and writer 

He was a literary critic and writer on cultural nationalism. He is the author of the successful novels Fantasias Humoriscicas (1881), Estaban (1883), The Passage of Venus (1884), and Flor de Campo (1886). He is mainly remembered for his essays on Chilean literature. These works of analysis and literary criticism include Platicas Literarias (1889), Critical studies to don José Victorino Lastarrias (1917), Studies on Chilean literature (1926–1940, 3 vols.), "Desolation" by Gabriela Mistral and "Al vivir" by Francisco Concha and Castillo (1929), Biography Carlos Walker Martínez (1904), Tales (1930) and the posthumous book entitled Bilbao and Lastarrias (1944).

Professor and literary chronicler 
He was a literary critic for the newspapers El Independiente, La Union and El Diario Ilustrado until his death. In addition, he taught literature at the Universidad de Chile, and College French brothers.

Personal life 

He was the secretary of war (1903–1913), notary public of finance of Santiago (1913 and 1939), and secretary-general of the Conservative Party (1901 to 1928).

He was the owner of Molino ranch (1877–1939) and Viña Antivero (1897–1939), in the commune of Rome, in the department of San Fernando. He died in Santiago de Chile.

Some editions

References

External links 

 
 Anales de la Universidad de Chile, Número 44. Imprenta del Siglo, 1873, página 9
 Google about Pedro Nolasco Cruz Vergara

1857 births
1939 deaths
People from Santiago
Dada
Chilean people of Spanish descent
Chilean people of Basque descent
19th-century Chilean novelists
Chilean male novelists
Chilean politicians
Vergara family
Cruz Family
19th-century Chilean male writers
19th-century Chilean lawyers
20th-century Chilean male writers